The men's 100 meters at the 1988 Summer Olympics in Seoul, South Korea saw world champion Ben Johnson of Canada defeat defending Olympic champion Carl Lewis of the United States in a world record time of 9.79, breaking his own record of 9.83 that he had set at the 1987 World Championships in Rome. Two days later, Johnson was stripped of his gold medal and world record by the International Olympic Committee (IOC) after he tested positive for stanozolol. The gold medal was then awarded to the original silver medalist Lewis, who had run 9.92. On 30 September 1989, following Johnson's admission to steroid use between 1981 and 1988, the IAAF rescinded his world record of 9.83 from the 1987 World Championship Final and stripped Johnson of his World Championship gold medal, which was also awarded to Lewis, who initially finished second. This made Lewis the first man to repeat as Olympic champion in the 100 metres (second, if Archie Hahn's 1906 Intercalated Games title is recognized).

Lewis's 9.92 from the Olympic final was also recognized as the official world record, breaking the 9.93 mark that Calvin Smith had set in 1983 and Lewis had since equalled twice. Smith also participated in this race and originally finished fourth, but was elevated to third place and awarded the bronze medal, and Linford Christie of the United Kingdom, who originally won the bronze medal, was elevated to silver. It would take eleven years for an athlete to run a "clean" 9.79 in the 100 meters, which was accomplished by Maurice Greene in Athens, Greece in 1999.

The other participants in this race, in order of finish, were Dennis Mitchell of the United States, who would go on to win the bronze medal in this event in Barcelona; Robson da Silva of Brazil, who won bronze in the 200 meters in Seoul; Johnson's teammate Desai Williams, a bronze medalist in the 4 x 100 meter relay in Los Angeles four years earlier; and Ray Stewart of Jamaica, who won a silver medal in the same relay at the Los Angeles Olympics.

102 competitors from 69 countries competed. Each nation was limited to three athletes under the rules laid down at the 1930 Olympic Congress.

Aftermath
Johnson was not the only participant whose success was questioned: Lewis had tested positive at the Olympic Trials for pseudoephedrine, ephedrine and phenylpropanolamine. Lewis defended himself, claiming that he had accidentally consumed the banned substances. After the supplements that he had taken were analyzed to prove his claims, the USOC accepted his claim of inadvertent use, since a dietary supplement he ingested was found to contain "Ma huang", the Chinese name for Ephedra (ephedrine is known to help weight loss). Fellow Santa Monica Track Club teammates Joe DeLoach and Floyd Heard were also found to have the same banned stimulants in their systems, and were cleared to compete for the same reason.

The highest level of the stimulants Lewis recorded was 6 ppm, which was regarded as a positive test in 1988 but is now regarded as negative test. The acceptable level has been raised to ten parts per million for ephedrine and twenty-five parts per million for other substances. According to the IOC rules at the time, positive tests with levels lower than 10 ppm were cause of further investigation but not immediate ban. Neal Benowitz, a professor of medicine at UC San Francisco who is an expert on ephedrine and other stimulants, agreed that "These [levels] are what you'd see from someone taking cold or allergy medicines and are unlikely to have any effect on performance."

Christie was found to have metabolites of pseudoephedrine in his urine after a 200m heat at the same Olympics, but was later cleared of any wrongdoing. Of the top five competitors in the race, only former world record holder and eventual bronze medalist Smith never failed a drug test during his career. Smith later said: "I should have been the gold medalist."

The CBC radio documentary, Rewind, "Ben Johnson: A Hero Disgraced" broadcast on September 19, 2013, for the 25th anniversary of the race, stated 20 athletes tested positive for drugs but were cleared by the IOC at this 1988 Seoul Olympics. An IOC official stated that endocrine profiles done at those games indicated that 80 percent of the track and field athletes tested showed evidence of long-term steroid use, although not all were banned.

Background

This was the twenty-first time the event was held, having appeared at every Olympics since the first in 1896. For the first time, the number of competitors topped 100.

Algeria, Bahrain, Burkina Faso, Hong Kong, the Maldives, Papua New Guinea, San Marino, Togo, Tonga, Vanuatu, South Yemen, and Zimbabwe appeared in the event for the first time. It was also the first appearance of "Chinese Taipei," though the Republic of China had competed before. The United States made its 20th appearance in the event, the most of any country, having missed only the boycotted 1980 Games.

Competition format

The event retained the same basic four round format introduced in 1920: heats, quarterfinals, semifinals, and a final. The "fastest loser" system, introduced in 1968, was used again to ensure that the quarterfinals and subsequent rounds had exactly 8 runners per heat; this time, the system was used in both the preliminaries and quarterfinals.

The first round consisted of 13 heats, each with 7 or 8 athletes. The top three runners in each heat advanced, along with the next nine fastest runners overall. This made 48 quarterfinalists, who were divided into 6 heats of 8 runners. The top two runners in each quarterfinal advanced, with four "fastest loser" places. The 16 semifinalists competed in two heats of 8, with the top four in each semifinal advancing to the eight-man final.

Records
These were the then-recognized world and Olympic records (in seconds) prior to the 1988 Summer Olympics.

1 This time was rescinded by the IAAF Council in September 1989 after Johnson admitted to using steroids between 1981 and 1988.

The following Olympic records were set during this competition.

Following Johnson's disqualification, Carl Lewis's time of 9.92 was recognized as a new Olympic record, and also became a new world record after Johnson's time was rescinded.

Results

Heats

Heat 1

Heat 2

Heat 3

Heat 4

Heat 5

Heat 6

Heat 7

Heat 8

Heat 9

Heat 10

Heat 11

Heat 12

Heat 13

Quarterfinals

Quarterfinal 1

Quarterfinal 2

Quarterfinal 3

Quarterfinal 4

Quarterfinal 5

Quarterfinal 6

Semifinals

Semifinal 1

Semifinal 2

Final

See also
 Women's 100 metres

References

Works cited
  Official Report

1
100 metres at the Olympics
Nicknamed sporting events
Men's events at the 1988 Summer Olympics